Women's Downhill World Cup 2001/2002

Final point standings

In Women's Downhill World Cup 2001/02 all results count.

References
 fis-ski.com

World Cup